Jiří Balcárek (born 29 April 1973) is a Czech football manager and former player. He played for Olomouc in the Czech First League and German side Union Berlin at club level and made two appearances for the  Czech Republic national team.

Managerial career
Balcárek started his coaching career in June 2005 as assistant manager of Sigma Olomouc' B-team. He then had a spell at SK Lipová as manager, before returning to Sigma Olomouc in the summer 2006 as manager of their B-team. In January 2009, Balcárek signed as manager of Sulko Zábřeh.

In April 2010, Balcárek was appointed manager of MFK Karviná. He resigned in October 2020 due to bad results. In January 2011, he returned to Sulko Zábřeh. He left the position in June 2015. He was then appointed manager of SK Uničov. After winning the 2016-17 Moravian-Silesian Football League, Balcárek was appointed manager of 1. SC Znojmo FK. However, he was fired on 31 January 2018.

In the summer 2018, Balcárek became manager of MFK Vítkovice. At the end of November 2019, he accepted a job offer from SFC Opava and became the clubs new manager. He left the club in June 2020.

In 2021-2022, Balcárek worked in a different role at FC Baník Ostrava, before returning to SK Uničov in September 2022.

References

External links
 

1973 births
Living people
Czech footballers
Czech Republic under-21 international footballers
Association football midfielders
Czech First League players
SK Sigma Olomouc players
1. FC Union Berlin players
Expatriate footballers in Germany
Czech expatriate sportspeople in Germany
Czech expatriate footballers
Czech football managers
SFC Opava managers
Czech First League managers